James Thomas "JT" Marcinkowski (born May 9, 1997) is an American professional soccer player who plays as a goalkeeper for Major League Soccer club San Jose Earthquakes.

Career

College and amateur
Marcinkowski played for the Georgetown Hoyas for three seasons, from 2015 to 2017, where he achieved a 0.84 goals against average (GAA) over 56 appearances. In his final season at Georgetown, he captained the team to a 2017 Big East Conference Men's Soccer Tournament championship win, his second with the team. He also played two games for the USL PDL side Burlingame Dragons.

Professional
Marcinkowski signed a Homegrown Player contract with the MLS side San Jose Earthquakes on December 6, 2017, after spending four years prior to his college career with the team's academy. He was San Jose's third ever Homegrown signing to the first team, after Tommy Thompson and Nick Lima. Marcinkowski was then temporarily loaned to San Jose's USL affiliate Reno 1868 FC, and played his first game for the team in Reno's 3–4 loss to Swope Park Rangers on March 17, 2018.

International
Marcinkowski has played for the United States' men's national team at multiple levels, earning 24 caps between the U14 and U18 levels. In 2017, he played for the U20 squad, at the 2017 CONCACAF U-20 Championship and the 2017 FIFA U-20 World Cup. Marcinkowski was named to the final 20-player United States under-23 roster for the 2020 CONCACAF Men's Olympic Qualifying Championship in March 2021.

Career statistics

Club

Honors
United States U20
CONCACAF Under-20 Championship: 2017

References

External links

 

1997 births
Living people
American soccer players
Association football goalkeepers
Burlingame Dragons FC players
Georgetown Hoyas men's soccer players
Homegrown Players (MLS)
Major League Soccer players
People from Alamo, California
Reno 1868 FC players
San Jose Earthquakes players
Soccer players from California
Sportspeople from the San Francisco Bay Area
USL Championship players
USL League Two players
United States men's under-20 international soccer players
United States men's under-23 international soccer players
American people of Polish descent